David Lilley (born 19 October 1975) is an English professional snooker player. He turned professional in 2019, after 30 years as an amateur.

Lilley is from Washington, Tyne and Wear, and is a supporter of Newcastle United F.C.

Career 
Lilley began playing snooker at the age of 13. His first big success was his victory at the (amateur) European Championships in 1995, defeating his compatriot David Gray 8–7. In the same year, he lost to Paul Hunter in the final of the Northern Amateur championship. In 1997, he reached the final of the English Amateur Championship for the first time and won it with a score of 8–7 against Robert Marshall. However, unable to find sponsorship in the wake of the sport's ban on tobacco advertising, and with only around six tournaments a year at that point, he felt he could not afford to turn professional and so remained an amateur.

In 1999, he won by an 8–5 victory in the final against Andrew Norman. In the same year, he reached the semifinals of the Amateur European Championships and the final of the World Amateur Snooker Championship, in which he was defeated by Ian Preece 11–8.

In 2000, he lost the final of the English Amateur Championship, 5–8 against Nick Marsh.

In February 2002, he participated for the first time in qualifying for the World Snooker Championship, but lost in the second qualifying round against Timothy Paling.

In 2004, Lilley won the English Amateur Championship for a third time, with an 8–6 victory over Wayne Cooper in the final. In the 2004 World Amateur Snooker Championship, he was narrowly defeated in the semi-finals 6–8 by the eventual champion Mark Allen. In qualifying for the 2005 World Snooker Championship, he retired in the third round against Stuart Mann.

He participated in the Players Tour Championship 2012/2013 – Event 2 in August 2012 and lost in the first qualifying round against Ben Harrison.

In May 2016, he tried to qualify for the Main Tour via Q School. In the first tournament he reached the final of his group but then lost against Chen Zhe; in the second tournament he retired in the second round. Although he missed the qualification for the Main Tour, as 17th on the Q-School Order of Merit he could participate as a substitute for tournaments of the season 2016/17.

At the 2016 Indian Open, the second world ranking tournament of the season, he qualified for a ranking tournament for the first time. After defeating Tian Pengfei 4–3 in qualifying, he eliminated Mike Dunn, Mark Williams and Robert Milkins in the main round to reach the quarterfinals, where he lost to England's Shaun Murphy 2–4.

He was first on the Q School Order of Merit in 2018. In the 18/19 season, he just missed out on gaining a tour card for the 19/20 season numerous times; he was 4th on the challenge tour list, and lost 5–4 to Kacper Filipiak in the 2019 EBSA European Snooker Championship, where a win would have granted him a place on the tour. He appeared in Snooker 19, making him the only player in the game who has never turned pro (the other amateurs in the game are former pros).

On 23 May 2019, he beat Sean Maddocks 4–0 in the final qualifying round of Q School - Event 1, finally becoming a professional after 30 years as an amateur. While an amateur, he had worked in the insurance industry. Lilley later remarked that his timing was bad, as no sooner had he joined the professional tour then the COVID-19 pandemic led to the mass cancellation of tournaments.

On 9 May 2021, Lilley overcame Jimmy White 5–3 to become the World Seniors Champion, entitling him to play in the 2021 Champion of Champions tournament. On 7 January 2022, Lilley was runner up to Peter Lines in the 2022 UK Seniors Championship, losing 4–1 in the final.

Performance and rankings timeline

Career finals

Non-ranking finals: 2 (1 title)

Amateur finals: 13 (6 titles)

References

External links 
 David Lilley at worldsnooker.com

1975 births
Living people
English snooker players
People from Washington, Tyne and Wear
Sportspeople from Tyne and Wear